Nesophanes fulgidum is a species of beetle in the family Cerambycidae, the only species in the genus Nesophanes.

References

Hesperophanini